I Put a Spell on You is a studio album by American jazz singer, songwriter, and pianist Nina Simone. Recorded in 1964 and 1965 in New York City, it was released by Philips Records in 1965. It peaked at number 99 on the Billboard 200 chart and number 9 on the UK Albums Chart. The title track "I Put a Spell on You" peaked at number 23 on the Hot R&B/Hip-Hop Songs chart and number 28 on the UK Singles Chart. 

The album was re-issued in November 2020 by Verve and Universal Music Enterprises as part of their "audiophile-grade" Acoustic Sounds series.

Critical reception
AllMusic reviewer Richie Unterberger gave the album 3 stars out of 5, calling it "One of her most pop-oriented albums, but also one of her best and most consistent." He added, "There are really fine tunes and interpretations, on which Simone gives an edge to the potentially fey pop songs, taking a sudden (but not uncharacteristic) break for a straight jazz instrumental with 'Blues on Purpose.'"

In 2017, NPR placed it at number 3 on the "150 Greatest Albums Made by Women" list. Writing for NPR, Audie Cornish called it "the closest you'll ever hear her come to pop."

Track listing

Personnel
Credits adapted from liner notes.

 Nina Simone – piano, vocals
 Rudy Stevenson – guitar
 Hal Mooney – arrangement, conducting
 Horace Ott – arrangement, conducting

Charts

References

External links
 

1965 albums
Nina Simone albums
Philips Records albums
Albums arranged by Hal Mooney
Albums arranged by Horace Ott
Albums produced by Hal Mooney